Todos Los Romances (All the Romances) is a box set compilation album by Mexican singer Luis Miguel. Released on 11 August 1998 by WEA Latina, the record features the three previously released Romance-themed albums in which Miguel covered classic boleros  in each of them: Romance (1991), Segundo Romance (1994), and Romances (1997). An editor for AllMusic rated the album four of five stars. Commercially, Todos Los Romances peaked at number four in Spain and was certified double Platinum in the country. It also achieved Gold status in Argentina and peaked at number 12 on the [[Billboard Top Latin Albums|Billboard'''s Top Latin Albums]] in the United States.

Background and release
In 1991, Miguel released his eighth studio album, Romance, a collection of classic boleros, the oldest dating to the 1940s. Produced by Armando Manzanero and arranged by Bebu Silvetti, the record was a success in Latin America and sold over seven million copies worldwide. It revived interest in the bolero genre, and was the first record by a Spanish-speaking artist to be certified Gold in Brazil, Taiwan and the United States. It received a Grammy nomination for Best Latin Pop Album. Its follow-up, Segundo Romance, was released in 1994; Manzanero, Juan Carlos Calderón and Kiko Cibrian co-produced the record with Miguel, with it winning a Grammy Award for Best Latin Pop Performance. In 1997 Romances was released, with Miguel and Manzanero co-producing Silvetti's arrangements; it sold over 4.5 million copies, winning another Grammy for Best Latin Pop Performance. Each of the three discs were certified Platinum by the Recording Industry Association of America for shipping one million copies in the United States. One year after the release of Romances, WEA Latina announced that it will issue a three-disc compilation album Todos Los Romances, which contains three Romance-themed albums and was released on 11 August 1998.

Reception
An editor for AllMusic gave the album a four out of five star rating. In Spain, Todos Los Romances'' debuted and peaked number four on the Spanish Albums Chart, selling over 200,000 copies in the country and gaining a double Platinum certification awarded by Productores de Música de España for shipping 200,000. In the United States, the record peaked at number 12 on the ''Billboard'''s Top Latin Albums and number six on the Latin Pop Albums chart. In Argentina, it was awarded Gold by the Argentine Chamber of Phonograms and Videograms Producers for shipments of 30,000 copies.

Track listing

Charts

Weekly charts

Year-end charts

Certifications

References

1998 compilation albums
Luis Miguel compilation albums
Warner Music Latina compilation albums
Spanish-language compilation albums